Anti-Peruvian sentiment refers to negative feelings, fear and hatred towards towards Peruvians based on a combination of historical, cultural, and ethnic prejudices.

It arose since the 19th century in some societies as a consequence of their territorial expansion and that germinated as a tendency in the nationalisms of neighboring countries, mainly Ecuador, Chile and to a lesser extent due to the disputed origin of different cultural manifestations, such as recipes and gastronomic preparations (such as pisco or picarones) or folkloric dances (such as the diablada or the morenada) whose origin is disputed or shared with Chile and Bolivia. In addition, due to different political and ideological differences with the Bolivarian leaders and their Chavista sympathizers in Venezuela.

It can manifest itself in many ways, such as individual hatred or discrimination, tabloid media, attacks by groups organized for that purpose, even on social networks.

By country

Argentina
In Argentina there has been marked racism throughout its history, with its particularities in the ways in which it is presented, related to history, culture and the ethnic groups that interact, with a derogatory tendency against those with marked indigenous traits. (like a large part of the Peruvian population), in addition to a preference to imitate the European and belittle the Latin American (expressed in illustrious figures such as Julio Argentino Roca, Juan Bautista Alberdi or Domingo Faustino Sarmiento, as well as in the promotion of white immigration in Article 25 of various Constitutions in the past). Because of all this, there are Argentines who have an anti-Peruvian attitude for racial or ultranationalist reasons. Since the 1970s, Paraguay, Peru and Bolivia have alternated as the largest issuers of immigrants to Argentina; in the vast majority of cases, these immigrants are ethnically indigenous or mestizo and often speak Spanish as a second language. Given Argentina's history of mass European immigration and assimilation since the mid-19th century, this has substantially affected immigration debates, leading to anti-indigenous and anti-immigrant racism, openly expressed by politicians and social leaders, particularly in times of economic difficulties.

Bolivia
Historically, relations between Peru and Bolivia have been cloudy and contradictory, with attempts at reunification and alliances between the two countries due to ethnic and cultural similarities, as well as a series of conflicts that have marked both populations, particularly the Battle of Ingavi. which is seen as the founding war of Bolivia and which has had an impact on the Bolivian imaginary a Peruvian-phobic tendency to see Peru as an expansionist nation that threatens its sovereignty and always opposes Bolivian interests, and a Peruvian reaction to dismiss to Bolivia as the rebel province of Alto Peru that must be annexed, which has generated discord between both peoples, deepened in the actions of their alliance in the War of the Pacific, where they have branded each other as traitors as the reason for their military defeat. All these historical actions have influenced the formation of the national identity in Bolivia with anti-Peruvian overtones.

Chile
In Chile, there is a history of an unfriendly policy with Peru since the commercial rivalry between Callao and Valparaíso during colonial times, beginning a geopolitical project well after its independence, formulated mainly by Diego Portales, to position Chile as the leader of the South Pacific, and for this, a cautious policy had to be followed regarding the hegemony of other competitors in its area of influence, such as Spain (which led to the Liberating Expedition of Peru and the Chincha Islands War) or Peru (which led to several conflicts such as the War against the Peru-Bolivian Confederation and the War of the Pacific).

It should also be mentioned that the battalions of Chilean origin became infamous for the acts of looting and excesses that they caused Peruvians during the war of independence, becoming notable for all kinds of crimes.

Ecuador
In Ecuador, anti-Peruvian sentiment is mainly related to irredentism due to the Gran Colombia–Peru War and the border conflict between the two countries. According to former ambassador Eduardo Ponce Vivanco, the violent anti-Peruvianism cultivated in Ecuador is comparable to the anti-Chileanism that subsists in a minority in Peru. The Ecuadorian government came to describe Peru as the "Cain of the Americas" due to its border disputes, in the first years after the signing of the Rio de Janeiro Protocol on 29 January  1942, a treaty that established the borders; in the Ecuadorian streets, phrases such as "Peruvian imperialism" were read. The governments of José María Velasco Ibarra, León Febres Cordero and Jaime Roldós Aguilera had an openly anti-Peruvian position.

Venezuela
Bolivarian Chavismo and its supporters have declared their contempt for the Peruvian government for, according to then-Venezuelan Foreign Minister Delcy Rodríguez in 2017, supporting "Venezuela's intervention in the world" due to the creation of the Lima Group. It has also been increased by the Venezuelan authorities, such as President Nicolás Maduro describing Peru as having an "imperialist mentality" and "lifelong anti-Bolivarian" for not being invited to the VIII Summit of the Americas held in Lima due to the crisis in Venezuela.

See also
 Anti-Chilean sentiment
 Chile–Peru relations
 Chilenization of Tacna, Arica, and Tarapacá
 Colombianization of Leticia, Putumayo and Caquetá
 Ecuadorian–Peruvian territorial dispute

References

 
Peruvian
Foreign relations of Peru